The 2020 Nebraska State Legislature elections took place as part of the biennial United States elections. Nebraska voters elected state senators in the 25 odd-numbered seats of the 49 legislative districts in the Nebraska Unicameral. State senators serve four-year terms in the unicameral Nebraska Legislature.

A top two primary election on May 12, 2020 determined which candidates appear on the November 3 general election ballot. Each candidate technically runs as a non-partisan (i.e., no party preference). The Nebraska State Legislature's website offers a statewide map of the 49 legislative districts here and maps for each individual district can be found on the website.

Following the 2018 elections, the Republicans maintained effective control of the Nebraska State Legislature with 30 seats. The Democrats increased their numbers from 16 to 18.

Republicans flipped three seats from Democrats; Democrats flipped one seat from Republicans and one from nonpartisan Ernie Chambers.

Open seats that changed parties

Democratic seats won by Republicans 

 District 31: Won by Rich Pahls.
District 45: Won by Rita Sanders.

Nonpartisan seats won by Democrats 

 District 11: Won by Terrell McKinney.

Incumbents defeated

In general elections

Democrats 

 District 35: Dan Quick (elected in 2016) lost to Raymond Aguilar.

Republicans 

 District 49: Andrew LaGrone (appointed in 2019) lost to Jen Day.

Close races

Detailed results

Note: All elections are technically non-partisan in the State Legislature; therefore, parties listed here are from candidates' websites and official party endorsement lists. Candidates all appear on the ballot as nonpartisan.
Candidates endorsed by the Republican Party:
Candidates endorsed by the Democratic Party:

District 1

District 3

District 5

District 7

District 9
Sara Howard (incumbent) was term-limited.

District 11
Ernie Chambers (incumbent) was term-limited.

District 13

District 15

District 17

District 19
Jim Scheer (incumbent) was term-limited.

District 21

District 23

District 25

District 27

District 29
Kate Bolz (incumbent) was term-limited.

District 31
Rick Kolowski (incumbent) retired.

District 33

District 35

District 37

District 39

District 41

District 43

District 45
Sue Crawford (incumbent) was term-limited.

District 47

District 49
John Murante (elected in 2016) resigned when elected Treasurer of Nebraska in 2018. Governor Pete Ricketts appointed Andrew LaGrone to fill the vacancy.

Notes

References

External links
 
 
  (State affiliate of the U.S. League of Women Voters)
 

legislature
Nebraska Senate
Nebraska Legislature elections
Non-partisan elections